Patheingyi Township is located in the eastern part of Mandalay, Myanmar. The township is bounded by Aungmyethazan Township and Chanayethazan Township in the west. Incorporated into the Mandalay city's limits, Patheingyi represents the eastward march of Mandalay's urban sprawl. Patheingyi is still largely made up of rice paddy fields but in the past two decades has become home to a number of universities.

Notable places
 Mandalay Tuberculosis Hospital
 Mandalay Technological University
 University of Computer Studies, Mandalay
 University of Culture, Mandalay
 University of Medical Technology, Mandalay
 University of Paramedical Science, Mandalay
 Upper Myanmar TB Center

References

Townships of Mandalay
Townships of Mandalay Region
Mandalay